Western Isles Strongest man was a strongman competition held at the village of Tong on the island of Lewis and Harris. The competition suffered from lack of financial and community support with the last competition taking place in 2011.

Unfortunately, due to financial difficulties and lack of interest the Lewis Highland Games and  Western Isles Strongest Man competition was wound up as a company on 14 March 2012.

Winners

See also 
 Angus MacAskill
 Donald Dinnie
 Stone put
 Angus Graham (strongman)
 Hammer toss
 Weight for Distance
 Weight for Height
 Scotland's Strongest Man
 Strongman

Notes

National strongmen competitions
Tourist attractions in the Outer Hebrides
Sport in the Outer Hebrides